The following outline is provided as an overview of and topical guide to abnormal psychology:

Abnormal psychology – is the scientific study of abnormal behavior in order to describe, predict, explain, and change abnormal patterns of functioning.  Abnormal psychology in clinical psychology studies the nature of psychopathology, its causes, and its treatments. Of course, the definition of what constitutes 'abnormal' has varied across time and across cultures. Individuals also vary in what they regard as normal or abnormal behavior.  Additionally, many current theories and approaches are held by psychologists, including biological, psychological, behavioral, humanistic, existential, and sociocultural.  In general, abnormal psychology can be described as an area of psychology that studies people who are consistently unable to adapt and function effectively in a variety of conditions.  The main contributing factors to how well an individual is able to adapt include their genetic makeup, physical condition, learning and reasoning, and socialization.

Nature of abnormal psychology

What type of thing is abnormal psychology?
Abnormal psychology can be described as all of the following:

 An academic discipline – focused study in one academic field or profession. A discipline incorporates expertise, people, projects, communities, challenges, studies, inquiry, and research areas that are strongly associated with a given discipline.
 One of the social sciences – concerned with society and the relationships among individuals within a society.
 A branch of psychology – study of mind and behavior.
 An applied science – discipline of science that applies existing scientific knowledge to develop more practical applications, like treating the mentally ill.

Essence of abnormal psychology 
 Abnormality
 Mental disorder
 Psychology
 Psychopathology

Approaches of abnormal psychology 

 Somatogenic – abnormality is seen as a result of biological disorders in the brain. This approach has led to the development of radical biological treatments, e.g. lobotomy.
 Psychogenic – abnormality is caused by psychological problems. Psychoanalytic (Freud), Cathartic, Hypnotic and Humanistic Psychology (Carl Rogers, Abraham Maslow) treatments were all derived from this paradigm.

Mental disorders 

Mental disorder
 List of mental disorders#Types of mental disorders – examples of mental disorders include:
 Anxiety disorder
 Bipolar disorder
 Delusional disorder
 Impulse control disorder
 Kleptomania
 Pyromania
 Personality disorder
 Obsessive–compulsive personality disorder
 Schizoaffective disorder
 Schizophrenia
 Substance use disorder
 Substance abuse
 Substance dependence
 Thought disorder
 Treatment of mental disorders
 Psychological evaluation
 Psychotherapy
 Psychiatric medication

Mental health professions 

Mental health profession
 Psychiatry
 Clinical psychology
 Psychiatric rehabilitation
 School psychology
 Clinical social work

Mental health professionals 

Mental health professional
 Psychiatrist
 Clinical psychologist
 School psychologist
 Mental health counselor

History of abnormal psychology 

History of mental disorders
 History of mental disorders, by type
 History of anxiety disorders
 History of posttraumatic stress disorder
 History of bipolar disorder
 History of depression
 History of major depressive disorder
 History of neurodevelopmental disorders
 History of autism
 History of Asperger syndrome
 History of obsessive–compulsive disorder
 History of personality disorders
 History of psychopathy
 History of schizophrenia
 History of the treatment of mental disorders
 History of clinical psychology
 History of electroconvulsive therapy
 History of electroconvulsive therapy in the United Kingdom
 History of psychiatry
 History of psychiatric institutions
 History of psychosurgery
 History of psychosurgery in the United Kingdom
 Lobotomy – consists of cutting or scraping away most of the connections to and from the prefrontal cortex, the anterior part of the frontal lobes of the brain. The purpose of the operation was to reduce the symptoms of mental disorder, and it was recognized that this was accomplished at the expense of the patient's personality and intellect! By the late 1970s, the practice of lobotomy had generally ceased.
 History of psychotherapy

Abnormal psychology organizations

Abnormal psychology publications

Journals 
 Behavior Genetics
 British Journal of Clinical Psychology
 Communication Disorders Quarterly
 Journal of Abnormal Child Psychology
 Journal of Abnormal Psychology
 Journal of Clinical Psychology
 Journal of Consulting and Clinical Psychology
 Molecular Psychiatry
 Psychological Medicine
 Psychology of Addictive Behaviors
 Psychology of Violence
 Psychosis (journal)

Persons influential in abnormal psychology

See also 

 Outline of psychology

References

External links 

 Definition of abnormal psychology, from Merriam-Webster MedlinePlus Medical Dictionary
 Abnormal Psychology Students Practice Resources
 Science Direct
 A Course in Abnormal Psychology
 NIMH.NIH.gov - National Institute of Mental Health
 International Committee of Women Leaders on Mental Health
 Mental Illness Watch
 Metapsychology Online Reviews: Mental Health 
 The New York Times: Mental Health & Disorders
 The Guardian: Mental Health
 Mental Illness (Stanford Encyclopedia of Philosophy)

 
Outlines of health and fitness
Abnormal psychology